The 10th Micronesian Games will be held in July 2023 in Majuro, Marshall Islands. After initially being scheduled for July 25 to August 5, 2022, the competition was delayed a year because of challenges posed by the COVID-19 pandemic, including finishing construction of the New Marshall Islands Stadium.

This will be the first time that the Marshall Islands will host the tournament, having been announced as host in July 2018. The Marshall Islands received unanimous support after the Northern Mariana Islands withdrew their bid to host.

The Marshall Islands Soccer Federation has indicated that the nation may field its first-ever national soccer team at the games.

References

Micro
2023
Micro
Micronesian Games